Caryocolum confluens is a moth of the family Gelechiidae. It is found in Greece.

The length of the forewings is about 6 mm. The forewings are blackish with white transverse fascia near the base. Adults have been recorded on wing from late June to early July.

References

Moths described in 1988
confluens
Moths of Europe